Alejandra Ruddoff (born 1960 in Santiago de Chile) is a Chilean sculptor.

Biography 
Ruddoff studied sculpture at the University of Chile and graduated in 1985. In 1993 - having received a scholarship from DAAD (German Academic Exchange Service) - she acquired a post-graduate diploma of the Munich Academy of Fine Arts. She was awarded the First Prize of the Chilean Ministry of Public Works in 2000. In addition, her work Homage to the Wind - which according to the writer Raúl Zurita has the germinating ease of a poem and at the same time the purity of most ancient monuments - was erected at the Panamericana. Special exhibitions of her three-dimensional works were staged at the National Museum of Fine Arts in Santiago de Chile and in the Tai Miao Temple in the Forbidden City of Beijing in 2003. Ruddoff has been teaching at arts academies since 2000. 
Ruddoff has developed large-format projects to be shown in public places. One of those is the construction Peace, Friendship and Time's Space (2001) which was modelled during the Fifth International Sculptors' Symposium held in Changchun and erected in its local sculpture park. Another of her sculptures Forward (1997) was unveiled in Potsdam in 2002. While staying at the Potsdam Volkswagen Design Center in 2006 she worked on variations of the objects. In 2010 the DAAD commissioned Ruddoff to sculpt Forward II which is now displayed in front of the DAAD headquarters at Bonn. She has been living as a freelance artist in Berlin since 2009.

Gallery

Exhibitions (a selection)

Works in public collections

Books 
 Alejandra Ruddoff. Nach Vorn Skulptur & Skizze, Hrsg.: Luisa Frigolett, Santiago, 2009
 Alejandra Ruddoff, Arte en Chile, Hrsg.: Ezio Mosciatti, Santiago, 2000

External links 
Alejandra Ruddoff
„Nach Vorn II“ vor dem DAAD-Hauptgebäude in Bonn

Living people
1960 births
20th-century Chilean women artists
21st-century Chilean women artists
Artists from Santiago
Chilean sculptors
University of Chile alumni